Parklands College and Christopher Robin Pre-Primary are private schools situated in Parklands, near Cape Town, South Africa. The college is managed by a board of directors represented by the managing director.

History 
In 1980, Lorraine Roth, opened the Christopher Robin Pre-Primary School.

The Western Seaboard was identified as a potential growth area through a research process that included consultation with the South African Department of Education. This was further supported by statistics provided by the town planning department of the Cape Town City Council. This research indicated that an independent school would complement the development of the new city and suburb of Parklands.

The construction of Parklands College commenced in 1998, in the new suburb of Parklands.  The College opened its doors in July 1998 and draws learners from Parklands, Table View, Blouberg, Melkbosstrand, Milnerton, Durbanville, Plattekloof, Sunset Links, Atlantic Beach and Darling.

School buildings 
The school is located on three campuses. The Pre-Primary and Junior Preparatory Faculty (Grades 1 to 3) are located at 91 Raats Drive. .

The Senior Preparatory Faculty (Grades 4 to 6) is situated at 50 Wood Drive.  and is directly opposite the Raats Drive campus.  Access between the two campuses is granted over a main road with a specially situated pedestrian crossing with traffic light.

The secondary faculty is at 1 College Avenue, Sandown.

Activities

Pre-primary 
Enrichment:  Piano, Violin, Recorder, Group Music (Minor Repertoire), isiXhosa, French, Ballet, Speech and Drama, Movement Exploration, Cookery and Information Technology
Sport:  Rugby, Cricket, Soccer, Tennis, Swimming, Physical Education and Junior Intro-Golf

Preparatory 
Additional activities:  Art Society, Drama Society, French Society, Public Speaking (Grade 4–6), ICT Club (Grade 3), Robotics, Computer Programming, Chess, Living Maths (Grade 3–6), Science Club
Dance:  Ballet (Grade 1–6) Modern Dance and Tap (Grade 3–6)
Music:  Choir, Orchestra, Orff, Marimba, Piano, Clarinet, Saxophone, Recorder, Flute, Cello, Violin, Drums, Guitar
Sport:  Rugby, Mini-Cricket (Grade 1–3), Cricket (Grade 4–6), Ball Sports (Grade 1–2), Swimming, Waterpolo (Grade 5–6), Tennis, Girls’ Softball, Soccer, Netball, Girls’ Hockey, Cross Country (Grade 4–6), Running Club (Grade 4–6), Junior lntro-Golf

Secondary 
Cultural Activities:  Debating, Public Speaking, Trinity Drama, Music, Dance
Music:  Piano, Clarinet, Saxophone, Recorder, Flute, Drums, Choir, Acapella, Orchestra, Violin, Cello, Voice, Guitar, Marimba, Drumline  Dance:  Ballet, Tap, Modern Dance
Clubs & Societies:  Book Club, Culinary, First Aid, Flashmob (Film and Photography), Freestyle Dancing, Fashion Design and Modelling, Laboratory Assistants, Jam Club (Guitar), Chess, Umpiring and Refereeing, Art, Rotary Interact (Outreach), Peer Counselling, College Avenue (Film & Media), Film Club, Mathematics Olympiad
Sport:  Rugby, Cricket, Soccer, Netball, Swimming, Tennis, Girls’ Softball, Waterpolo, Girls’ Hockey

Information and communication technology 
Parklands College offers comprehensive information and communication technology programmes including:
 Apple certification programs
 International Computer Driving License Training & Testing Centre
 CompTIA Partner

School crest and motto 
The school takes its arms from the Roth family. The arms are described as Blazen of Arms Azure, a unicorn ramant argent. Crest a unicorn, issuant.

Scholarships 
New learners applying to enter the secondary faculty are required to write an entrance assessment, which will assess the learner's ability in English and mathematics. Scholarships may be awarded to students on merit.

Past matriculation results 

New Curriculum NSC (National Senior Certificate) 2011

References

External links

 

Educational institutions established in 1980
1980 establishments in South Africa
Private schools in the Western Cape
Schools in Cape Town